Stenocercus quinarius is a lizard found in Brazil.

References

Stenocercus
Reptiles described in 2006